Florentin Phạm Huy Tiến (born 2 March 1997) is a Romanian born Vietnamese professional footballer who plays as right-back for Liga I club FCSB.

Personal life 
Florentin was born to a Vietnamese father and a Romanian mother.

Statistics 

Statistics accurate as of match played 22 January 2022

Honours

Club
FCSB:
Romanian Liga I: 2014–15
Romanian Cup: 2014–15, 2019–20
Romanian League Cup: 2014–15

See also
 List of Vietnam footballers born outside Vietnam

References

External links
  

1997 births
Living people
Romanian people of Vietnamese descent
Sportspeople from Brăila
Romanian footballers
Association football defenders
Association football midfielders
Romania youth international footballers
Liga I players
Liga II players
ASC Daco-Getica București players
FC Steaua București players
LPS HD Clinceni players
FC Steaua II București players
FC Metaloglobus București players